La Ferté Abbey was a Cistercian monastery founded in 1113 in La Ferté-sur-Grosne in the present commune of Saint-Ambreuil, Saône-et-Loire, France, the first of the four great daughter-houses of Cîteaux Abbey. It was dissolved in 1791.

History
The abbey was founded in 1113 by Stephen Harding as the first daughter house of Cîteaux Abbey, the mother house of the Cistercian reform. Along with Morimond Abbey, Clairvaux Abbey and Pontigny Abbey it was one of the four primary abbeys of the Cistercian order to which all other Cistercian houses were affiliated. It stood on a wild site located between the forest of Bragny and the swampy land of the Grosne.

It benefitted greatly from the generosity of the entourage of the Dukes of Burgundy and of the local nobility, especially the family of Gros de Brancion, and rapidly gained wealth and importance.

In 1165-66 it was caught up in the conflicts between Hugh III, Duke of Burgundy, and  Counts Gerard of Mâcon and William of Chalon.

The conventual buildings were reconstructed in the 13th century.

In 1362 the abbey was occupied by the roaming brigands known as the Tard-Venus. It was fortified in 1415, but this did not prevent it from being looted in 1562 und 1567. In 1570 it was set on fire by the Protestant troops of Gaspard de Coligny; the only buildings to survive were the church, the sacristy, the chapter house and an adjoining room. The abbot François de Beugre obtained permission in 1574 to sell lands in order to fund the rebuilding. The final works - the construction of the dormitory and the redecoration of the church - were completed in the early 17th century under his successor, Yves Sauvageot.

In 1682 the abbot Claude Petit refurbished the abbot's lodgings and the cloister, while the fortification wall was demolished and the defensive ditch filled in. Further works were undertaken by the abbot François Filzjean de Chemilly in about 1760, principally to the frontage of the abbot's residence, which bears his arms.

The last abbot, Antoine-Louis Desvignes de la Cerve, commissioned a scheme of interior redecoration from the local architect Rameau, for which he granted him a pension.

The abbey was dissolved in 1791 during the French Revolution, by which time the community numbered only 14 monks, and some of the outbuildings were occupied by the workers, some of them women, from the cotton factory which had been established elsewhere on the site. The buildings were sold as national assets and largely destroyed, including the abbey church.

Present

The only substantial survival of the premises is the 18th century abbot's house, now known as the Château de la Ferté, built on a slight elevation, with a two-storey central block of three bays, wings of four bays with mansard roofs and corner blocks of two bays. This building contains the original monastic refectory. It was listed as a monument historique in 1993.

Daughter houses
La Ferté was the direct founder of five daughter houses:

 Maizières Abbey in France (with its daughter house Sturzelbronn Abbey)
 Tiglieto Abbey in Italy (with its daughter houses Staffarda Abbey and Casanova Abbey)
 Lucedio Abbey in Italy (with its daughter houses Rivalta Scrivia Abbey, Chortaiton Abbey in Greece and the Abbey of St George, Jubin near Antioch in Turkey) 
 Barona Abbey in Italy
 St Sergius's Abbey in the Lebanon

List of abbots

1113–1117 : Philibert
1117–1123 : Obizon
1123–1132 : Pierre I
1132–1171 : Barthélémy I
1171–1178 : Guillaume I
1178–1194 : Hervé de Faverney
1194–1199 : Bruno I
1198–1199 : Guillaume II
1199–1201 : Nicolas
1203–1205 : Eudes
1205–1206 : Pierre II
1206–1229 : Simon
1230–1232 : Boniface
1232–1233 : Vincent
1233–1234 : Guillaume III
1234–1239 : Robert
1239–1266 : Barthélémy II
1266–1276 : Jean I
1276–1285 : Gérard
1285–1297 : Rufin
1287–1317 : Pierre III de Montcalier
1317–1321 : Huges
1321–1341 : Jean II de Marcilly
1341–1346 : Bruno II
1346–1357 : Durand de Marcilly
1357–1371 : Claude I
1371–1385 : Pierre IV de Marcilly
1385–1392 : Guy de Saint-Romain
1392–1412 : Etienne I de La Chèze
1412–1416 : Guillaume IV
1416–1419 : Etienne II de Marcilly
1419–1439 : Jean III de Beaune
1439–1470 : Jean IV de Saint-Pierre
1470–1506 : Claude II de Dinteville
1506–1549 : Antoine I de Vienne
1549–1567 : René Dantoncour
1567–1569 : Elzéar de Rastel
1569–1574 : Louis de Breschard
1574–1600 : François I de Beugre
1600–1655 : Yves Sauvageot
1655–1677 : Pierre V Bouchu
1677–1710 : Claude III Petit
1710–1725 : Jean-Marie Vernois de Montjournal
1725–1733 : Jean-Charles Descriveux
1733–1761 : François II Filzjean de Chemilly
1761–1783 : François III Claude-Gaspard de Cannablin
1783–1791 : Antoine II Louis Desvignes de La Cerve

Notes

Sources and external links
Abbaye de la Ferté 
Certosa di Firenze: La Ferté
Cistercium: La Ferté 
 Auberger, Jean-Baptiste, 2000: La Ferté, in: André Vauchez (ed.), Encyclopedia of the Middle Ages. James Clarke & Co: Cambridge
 Peugniez, Bernard, nd: Routier cistercien (2nd edn), pp. 61–62. Editions Gaud: Moisenay 

Ferte
1113 establishments in Europe
1110s establishments in France
Religious organizations established in the 1110s
1791 disestablishments in France
Christian monasteries established in the 12th century
Buildings and structures in Saône-et-Loire
Monuments historiques of Bourgogne-Franche-Comté